St Germain is the fourth studio album by French house producer Ludovic Navarre, under his main pseudonym St Germain. It was released on 9 October 2015 via Primary Society. Two official singles had been released from the album: "Real Blues" which features the vocals of Lightnin' Hopkins and "Sittin' Here" (vocals in Bambara language by Malian singer Nahawa Doumbia stem from her song Koro Dia).

Reception

St Germain received positive reviews from critics upon release. On Metacritic, the album holds a score of 73/100 based on 8 reviews, indicating generally favorable reviews.

Track listing

Charts

Weekly charts

Year-end charts

References

2015 albums
St. Germain (musician) albums